is a railway station on the Chikuho Main Line operated by JR Kyushu in Nōgata, Fukuoka Prefecture, Japan.

Lines

Station layout 
The station consists of two side opposed platforms serving two tracks. A station building, of modern design and shaped to resemble a traditional coal-ferrying boat, houses a waiting room and automatic ticket vending machines. Access to the opposite side platform is by means of a level crossing with steps at both ends.

Adjacent stations

History 
The station was opened by JR Kyushu on 11 March 1989 as an additional station on the existing Chikuhō Main Line track.

On 4 March 2017, Shinnyū, along with several other stations on the line, became a remotely managed "Smart Support Station".

Passenger statistics
In fiscal 2016, the station was used by an average of 424 passengers daily (boarding passengers only), and it ranked 261st among the busiest stations of JR Kyushu.

References

External links
Shinnyū Station (JR Kyushu)

Railway stations in Fukuoka Prefecture
Railway stations in Japan opened in 1989